Tetris: Axis, released as Tetris in some regions, is a puzzle video game developed by Hudson Soft and Bandai for the Nintendo 3DS. The game was released in all regions in October 2011 and was published by Namco Bandai Games in Japan, Nintendo in North America, and Tetris Online in Europe and Australia.

Game modes
Tetris: Axis features over 20 game modes, which are divided up into three modes, Featured modes, Party modes, and AR modes.

Featured modes 
Fever: The player must get as many points as possible in only a minute of time. Racking up a certain number of points as quickly as possible earns the player color bonuses which when used, alter the gameplay and rack up extra points.
Computer Battle: The player competes against computer players where clearing lines floods the opponent's area with garbage blocks that can only be eliminated by clearing them.
Marathon: The standard mode of gameplay.
Survival: The player plays in an extra-narrow area while blocks are constantly rising up from the bottom. The game ends if the stack of blocks rises to the top.

Party Modes 
Jigsaw: Every piece contains a part of a picture and the piece must be correctly oriented before it is dropped into place.
Shadow Wide: There is a picture shadowed out on the lower screen and the pieces must be dropped in to reveal it.
Fit: The pieces are flying continuously at a wall with a hole cut out in it and the shapes must be moved to fit through the hole or else crash into the wall.
Tower Climber: Similar to the tower climber mode in Tetris Party except that the tower is now a 3D cylinder.
Bombliss Plus: Based on the Bombliss variant, every piece has a bomb inside and clearing a row containing one makes it explode and clear out all surrounding pieces.
Stage Racer: Similar to the stage racer mode in Tetris Party, the player must guide a single piece through a continuously moving obstacle course, with the game ending if the piece hits the top.
Capture: Colored stars are hidden within the playfield and the player can only remove them by touching them with blocks of the same color.
Master Mode: A variant of the standard mode where the pieces appear on the field instantly instead of falling down.
Sprint: The player must clear 40 lines in as little time as possible.

Augmented reality modes 
AR Marathon: The player must clear 50 lines as fast as possible. Some block contain bombs which shift the field if activated, requiring the player to move the system to reorient it.
AR Climber: Similar to the Tower Climber mode except the player must manually rotate the tower.

Development
The music was composed by Brian DiLucente.

Release
Tetris: Axis was released on October 2, 2011 in North America and in Europe on October 21 under the name Tetris. The North American version was released for the Nintendo eShop on April 19, 2013.

In November 2014, it was announced that Tetris for Nintendo 3DS and the Virtual Console release of Tetris for Game Boy would be removed from the European Nintendo 3DS eShop at the end of that year. On December 31, 2014, both games were removed from the European and North American Nintendo 3DS eShops, despite there being no prior announcement of the removal from the North American Nintendo 3DS eShop.

Reception

Tetris: Axis received "average" reviews according to the review aggregation website Metacritic. In Japan, Famitsu gave it a score of one eight and three sevens for a total of 29 out of 40.

References

External links
 

2011 video games
Hudson Soft games
Bandai games
Bandai Namco games
Nintendo games
Nintendo 3DS games
Nintendo 3DS eShop games
Nintendo 3DS-only games
Nintendo Network games
Tetris
Video games developed in Japan
Multiplayer and single-player video games